Vincent Denson (born 24 November 1935) is a former professional racing cyclist who rode the Tour de France, won a stage of the Giro d'Italia and won the Tour of Luxembourg in the 1960s.

He was a team-mate of Rik Van Looy and of Jacques Anquetil and, in the Tour de France, of Tom Simpson. He was the first British rider to win a stage of the Giro, before finishing 40th overall.

Origins 

Denson was born in Chester, England. He had his first bike at 12, a black Hercules Falcon borrowed from his brother and with wooden blocks fitted to the pedals to make it smaller. He began riding to Helsby Hill, Rhyl and Prestatyn and went youth-hostelling. At 17 he joined Chester Road Club, initially for touring but then to race. He was inspired by his French teacher at school, who had lived in France, whose hero was Jean Robic and who gave his class Miroir du Cyclisme to study. Denson's first race was an evening 25-mile time-trial, which he finished in 1h 4 m 30s. He said:

Denson finished four times in the top 12 of the British Best All-Rounder competition, which aggregates rides over 50 and 100 miles and 12 hours. He came seventh in the Milk Race in 1959 and fifth in 1960. He finished the Peace Race of 1960 and 1961 in 17th and 27th. The Peace Race, which linked Berlin, Warsaw and Prague was run over roads often still wrecked from the Second World War. It was always keenly contested by riders from the communist bloc. Denson said:

Semi-professional career 
Denson failed to make the British team for the Olympic Games and took out a licence as an independent, or semi-professional, for Temple Cycles in 1961. He and three other riders, Ken Laidlaw, Stan Brittain and Sean Ryan, moved to Donzenac, near Brive.

Denson rode for Britain in the 1961 Tour de France, which was for national teams. Only three of the team – Laidlaw, Brian Robinson and Seamus Elliott got to the finish. Denson dropped out on the col de la République, also known as the col du Grand Bois, outside St-Étienne.

Denson returned to York, where he and his wife, Vi, were buying a house. In March 1962 they decided to return to France, travelling to Paris and then to Troyes, where Denson joined the UVC Aube club, sponsored by Frimatic. He was paid £24 a month.

He won the GP Frimatic by four minutes and then the eight-day Vuelta Bidasoa, in Spain. He won a stage of a professional race, the Circuit d'Aquitaine in France and came sixth in the Grand Prix des Nations despite being led off course and twice losing his chain.

Of his Circuit of Aquitaine ride, he said:

Professional career 
Denson's club recommended him to Maurice de Muer, manager of the Pelforth-Sauvage Lejeune professional team. De Muer promised him a contract if he won a stage of the Circuit d'Aquitaine and rode well in the Grand Prix des Nations. Denson signed with Pelforth in October 1963, when he was 27, riding in the yellow, white and blue of the French brewery and its cosponsor, a bicycle factory. He was the second Englishman in the team, with Alan Ramsbottom.

He came 10th in Milan–San Remo and in Paris–Nice but didn't make Pelforth's Tour team. Denson was already unhappy with Pelforth, where the policy was to pay riders' salaries at the end and not during the season. He was already reduced to eating carrots found in fields while training. Not riding the Tour was a further financial blow.

He left Troyes in 1964, hoping for a place with Tom Simpson in the Peugeot team. When the place didn't become free, he moved to Ghent, in Belgium. There, if he couldn't ride for Simpson he could at least train with him. In races, however, they would be rivals; Denson was to ride for Rik Van Looy in the Solo team, sponsored by a margarine company. He was the only foreigner in the team and never did master the Dutch that the rest of team spoke.

The team won six stages of that year's Tour de France.

That autumn, at the world championship at Sallanches, France, Jacques Anquetil and his directeur-sportif, Raphaël Géminiani, said they had been watching Denson and wanted him for a team they were creating, sponsored by Ford-France. Denson stayed with Anquetil when the sponsor changed to Bic, opened a bar in Ghent, and had what he called the happiest years of his racing life.

Simpson's death 
Denson rode for Britain in the 1967 Tour de France. During it, his friend Tom Simpson died close to the summit of Mont Ventoux. He said of the hours at the hotel waiting for news of his leader:

Next day the French rider, Jean Stablinski, said the remaining riders wanted Denson, as Simpson's closest friend, to ride ahead of the race and win for Simpson. The victory went instead to Barry Hoban, who said he found himself at the front but remembers nothing else. Denson is still upset.

Denson lost heart, began missing contracts. He recovered by the end of the year and talked to the Italian team, Molteni, about joining. Instead he signed for Kelvinator to ride the Giro d'Italia. A year later (1968) he returned to Britain and rode for the domestic professional team, Bantel.

Giro d'Italia 

Denson won a stage of the Giro d'Italia, stage 9 in 1966 before finishing 40th overall. He said:

Denson said Italian fans often made a pretence of helping push foreign riders up hills while pulling at their brakes to slow them down.

He said his time-trialling experience helped him chase riders like Motta.

Private life and retirement 
In 1969 Denson opened a wood-treatment business near Harlow, Essex, before dropping out of professional racing. He now races as an amateur.

Denson was known in continental Europe as Vic, a name he acquired because Vin – short for Vincent – is French for "wine".

References

Further reading 
 

1935 births
British Giro d'Italia stage winners
English male cyclists
Living people
Sportspeople from Chester
Cycling writers